The 2016 Women's U23 African Volleyball Championship was the 2nd edition of the Women's U23 African Volleyball Championship, it was held 20 to 27 October 2016 in Nairobi, Kenya. The tournament was organized by the African Volleyball Confederation, in association with Kenya Volleyball Association.

The tournament served as the African qualifiers for the 2017 FIVB Volleyball Women's U23 World Championship held in Ljubljana, Slovenia which the top tow teams of the tournament qualified for the world championship. Egypt won the tournament for the second time. Kenya finished second.

Participated teams

Venue

Final group

|}

|}

Final standing

Awards
Most Valuable Player
 Aya Ahmed

See also
2017 Men's U23 African Volleyball Championship

References

External links
Egypt & Kenya Qualify for 2017 U23 Women's World Championships - afvb.org

2016 in women's volleyball
2016 in Kenyan sport
Volleyball in Kenya
International volleyball competitions hosted by Kenya